The Russian Junior Rhythmic Gymnastics Championships are organized annually by the Russian Rhythmic Gymnastics Federation.

Competitors are divided into the following two age categories: juniors (13–15 years old) and girls (девочки, 9–12). (As of 2020, age 13 to 15 years corresponds to birth years 2005 to 2007, and age 11 to 12 years corresponds to birth years 2008 to 2009.) Juniors perform routines corresponding to the Candidate for Master of Sports (CMS) skill level, girls performs routines corresponding to the First Class skill level.

Some events can be held simultaneously with the senior nationals. For example, in 2019 the individual events took place in January in Kazan as "Russian Junior Individual Championships", while the group events were held as "Russian Junior Group Championships" in the summer in Moscow's newly built Gymnastics Palace simultaneously with the senior individual championships.

Medalists in individual all-around

CMS

First Class

References

External links 
 Competitions section on the Russian Rhythmic Gymnastics Federation website (in Russian)

Gymnastics competitions in Russia
Rhythmic gymnastics competitions
Youth sport in Russia
Russian Rhythmic Gymnastics Championships
Recurring sporting events
National championships in Russia